1175 Margo, provisional designation , is a stony background asteroid from the outermost regions of the asteroid belt, approximately 24 kilometers in diameter. It was discovered on 17 October 1930, by astronomer Karl Reinmuth at the Heidelberg-Königstuhl State Observatory in southwest Germany. The meaning of the asteroids's name is unknown.

Orbit and classification 

Margo is a non-family asteroid from the main belt's background population. It orbits the Sun in the outermost asteroid belt at a distance of 3.0–3.4 AU once every 5 years and 9 months (2,107 days; semi-major axis of 3.22 AU). Its orbit has an eccentricity of 0.07 and an inclination of 16° with respect to the ecliptic.

Physical characteristics 

Margo has been characterized as a stony S-type asteroid by Pan-STARRS photometric survey. Conversely, the Collaborative Asteroid Lightcurve Link (CALL) assumes it to be a carbonaceous C-type.

Rotation period and poles 

In November 2005, a rotational lightcurve of Margo was obtained from photometric observations by astronomers Raymond Poncy, Gino Farroni, Pierre Antonini, Donn Starkey and Raoul Behrend. Lightcurve analysis gave a well-defined rotation period of 6.0136 hours with a brightness amplitude of 0.31 magnitude. Since then, several other, lower-rated lightcurves have been published.

In 2016, the asteroid lightcurve has also been modeled using photometric data from various sources. It gave a concurring period of 6.01375 hours and two spin axis in ecliptic coordinates of (184.0°, −43.0°) and (353.0°, −17.0°).

Diameter and albedo 

According to the surveys carried out by the Japanese Akari satellite and the NEOWISE mission of NASA's Wide-field Infrared Survey Explorer, Margo measures between 22.99 and 25.394 kilometers in diameter and its surface has an albedo between 0.2409 and 0.302. CALL assumes a standard albedo for carbonaceous asteroids of 0.057 and consequently calculates a much larger diameter of 58.29 kilometers based on an absolute magnitude of 9.9.

Naming 

This minor planet was named by the discoverer Karl Reinmuth. Any reference of its name to a person or occurrence is unknown.

Unknown meaning 

Among the many thousands of named minor planets, Margo is one of 120 asteroids, for which no official naming citation has been published.

References

External links 
 Asteroid Lightcurve Database (LCDB), query form (info )
 Dictionary of Minor Planet Names, Google books
 Asteroids and comets rotation curves, CdR – Observatoire de Genève, Raoul Behrend
 Discovery Circumstances: Numbered Minor Planets (1)-(5000) – Minor Planet Center
 
 

001175
Discoveries by Karl Wilhelm Reinmuth
Named minor planets
19301017